The Endomycetaceae are a family of yeasts in the order Saccharomycetales. According to the 2007 Outline of Ascomycota, the family contains three genera; however, the placement of the genus Phialoascus is uncertain. Species in this poorly understood family have cosmopolitan distributions, and typically grow in association with other fungi, perhaps parasitically.

References

External links

Saccharomycetes
Taxa named by Joseph Schröter
Ascomycota families